Malyadri Sriram is an Indian politician and a former member of parliament from Bapatla (Lok Sabha constituency), Andhra Pradesh. He won the 2014 Indian general election being a Telugu Desam Party candidate. He has an M.A. in Economics from Sri Venkateshwara University in Tirupathi. He was previously an officer with the Indian Revenue Service. He was elected to the 16th Lok Sabha. In the Lok Sabha he was a member of the Standing Committee on Energy and the Consultative Committee, Ministry of Finance and Corporate Affairs.

Education

Political career 
He resigned from Indian Revenue Service and joined Telugu desam party

Malyadri Sriram contested in 2009 loksabha elections from Bapatla parliamentary constituency and lost to Panakabaka Lakshmi, INC

In 2014 elections, he again contested from same constituency and was elected to loksabha

Personal life 
Malyadri Sriram is married to Smt. S. Ranganayakamma. He has a son and two daughters

References

India MPs 2014–2019
Lok Sabha members from Andhra Pradesh
Telugu Desam Party politicians
Living people
Telugu politicians
1954 births